was a town located in Kanzaki District, Hyōgo Prefecture, Japan.

As of 2003, the town had an estimated population of 5,213 and a density of 53.65 persons per km2. The total area was 97.17 km2.

On November 7, 2005, Okawachi, along with the town of Kanzaki (also from Kanzaki District), was merged to create the town of Kamikawa.

Dissolved municipalities of Hyōgo Prefecture
Kamikawa, Hyōgo